Cedar is an unincorporated community located in Mingo County, West Virginia, United States. Its post office  is closed.

Geography 
Cedar is located in the Appalachian Mountains and has an average elevation of 745 ft (227 m)

References 

Unincorporated communities in West Virginia
Unincorporated communities in Mingo County, West Virginia
Coal towns in West Virginia